Bambusa angustiaurita is a species of Bambusa bamboo.

Distribution 
Bambusa angustiaurita is endemic to temperate regions of Guangdong province of China.

Description 
Bambusa angustiaurita is perennial and grows short rhizomes in caespitose form. Its tips are inclined at the tip, which reaches 800–1000 cm in height with its woody stem growing to 30–60 cm.

References 

angustiaurita
Flora of Guangdong